John Garven Blackwood (26 August 1899 – c. 1979) was a rugby union player who represented Australia.

Blackwood, a hooker, was born in Mona Vale, New South Wales and claimed a total of 21 international rugby caps for Australia. He was inducted into the Australian Rugby Union's Hall of Fame in 2015.

References

Australian rugby union players
Australia international rugby union players
1899 births
1970s deaths
Rugby union players from Sydney
Rugby union hookers